Benjamin Babati (born 29 November 1995) is a Hungarian professional footballer who plays for Győr on loan from Mezőkövesd.

Club career
On 5 January 2022, Babati signed a 2.5-year contract with Mezőkövesd. On 16 July 2022, he was loaned to Győr.

International career
In September 2020, Babati was called up to the Hungary national football team for Nations League games against Turkey and Russia, but remained on the bench in both games.

Personal life
Benjamin Babati is the son of former Hungarian professional football player Ferenc Babati.

Career statistics

References

External links

Magyarfutball 

1995 births
People from Zalaegerszeg
Sportspeople from Zala County
Living people
Hungarian footballers
Association football forwards
Zalaegerszegi TE players
Mezőkövesdi SE footballers
Győri ETO FC players
Nemzeti Bajnokság I players
Nemzeti Bajnokság II players